Events in the year 1938 in Belgium.

Incumbents
Monarch – Leopold III (from 17 February)
Prime Minister – Paul-Émile Janson (to 15 May); Paul-Henri Spaak (from 15 May)

Events
 12 March – Henri de Man resigns as finance minister after his fiscal proposals are rejected.
 13 May – Paul-Émile Janson's governing coalition falls apart.
 15 May – Paul-Henri Spaak forms a government of national unity.
 9 October – Municipal elections
 11 September – 26th Gordon Bennett Cup held in Liège.

Publications
 Willem Elsschot, Het Been
 Marius Valkhoff, Philologie et littérature wallonnes (Gronginen and Batavia, J. B. Wolters)

Art and architecture

Buildings
 Art Deco Flagey Building in Brussels completed.

Paintings
 René Magritte, La Durée poignardée

Births
 3 April – Gérard Sulon, footballer (died 2020)

Deaths
 14 July – Charles Liebrechts (born 1858), explorer
 27 December – Emile Vandervelde (born 1866), politician

References

 
1930s in Belgium
Belgium
Years of the 20th century in Belgium
Belgium